Soundpool is an American, New York City-based shoegaze band, formed in 2005.

History
Led by singer Kim Field and guitarist John Ceparano (previously with the Loveless and Jet Set Six), Soundpool formed in 2005, also featuring drummer James Renard (formerly of the Idle and the Happy Scene), keyboardist Mark Robinson and rotating bassists including Ben Malkin, Rich Bennett, Dean McCormick and Andy Durutti. Sanford Santacroce later joined as the group's permanent bassist.

Soundpool's debut studio album, On High, was released May 16, 2006 by Aloft Records, followed by Dichotomies & Dreamland in 2008.

The "But It's So" 7" single was released by Killer Pimp on January 26, 2010 in a limited edition of 500 copies.
 
Mirrors in Your Eyes, the band's third album, was released by Killer Pimp on April 27, 2010. It was noted for its unusual blend of shoegaze and disco. 

Re-mirrored, an extended play featuring remixes by Colder, Lawrence Chandler, GTO, Strategy and Syntaks, was issued on May 24, 2011.

The band then went on indefinite hiatus.

Other projects
Field and Ceparano formed the band the Stargazer Lilies, who have since released three albums: We Are the Dreamers (2013), Door to the Sun (2016) and Lost (2017).

Discography

Studio albums
On High (2006, Aloft Records)
Dichotomies & Dreamland (2008, Aloft Records)
Mirrors in Your Eyes (2010, Killer Pimp)

Singles and EPs
"But It's So" 7" single (2010, Killer Pimp)
Re-mirrored EP (2011, Killer Pimp)

Members
Current members:
 Kim Field - vocals, Q-chord, omnichord, keyboard
 John Ceparano - guitar, bass, vocals
 Mark Robinson - keyboards
 James Renard - drums
 Sanford Santacroce - bass

Former members:
 Ben Malkin - bass
 Rich Bennett - bass
 Dean McCormick - bass
 Andy Durutti - bass
 Paolo Martin - bass

References 

American shoegaze musical groups
2005 establishments in New York City
Musical groups from New York City
Musical groups established in 2005
2012 disestablishments in New York (state)
Musical groups disestablished in 2012